Ethmostigmus is a genus of centipedes of the family Scolopendridae, containing the following species:

Ethmostigmus albidus Tömösváry, 1885
Ethmostigmus californicus Chamberlin, 1958
Ethmostigmus coonooranus Chamberlin 1920
Ethmostigmus curtipes L. E. Koch 1983
Ethmostigmus granulosus Pocock 1898
Ethmostigmus muiri L. E. Koch 1983
Ethmostigmus nudior L. E. Koch 1983
Ethmostigmus pachysoma L. E. Koch 1983
Ethmostigmus parkeri L. E. Koch 1983
Ethmostigmus pygomegas Kohlrausch 1878
Ethmostigmus relictus Chamberlin 1944
Ethmostigmus rubripes Brandt, 1840
Ethmostigmus rugosus Haase, 1887
Ethmostigmus spinosus
Ethmostigmus trigonopodus Leach, 1817
Ethmostigmus tristis Meinert, 1886
Ethmostigmus venenosus Attems, 1897
Ethmostigmus waiainus Chamberlin, 1920

References

Further reading

Centipede genera